Monstrance for a Grey Horse is a granite sculpture of a horse's skull on a pedestal by James Acord, installed on the Southwestern University campus in Georgetown, Texas, United States. It was donated by the university by alumnus Joey King, who purchased the artwork from the sculptor in 2000.

See also
 Madonna and Child (Umlauf), another artwork installed at Southwestern University

References

Buildings and structures in Georgetown, Texas
Granite sculptures in Texas
Horses in art
Outdoor sculptures in Texas
Southwestern University